Monsieur Albert is a 1932 French comedy film directed by Karl Anton and starring Noël-Noël, Betty Stockfeld and Marcel Barencey. It was produced by the French subsidiary of Paramount Pictures at the Joinville Studios in Paris.

The film's sets were designed by the art director Henri Ménessier.

Cast
Noël-Noël as Monsieur Albert  
Betty Stockfeld as Sylvia Robertson  
Marcel Barencey as Octave 
Charles Carson as Mr. Robertson  
Edwige Feuillère as La comptesse Peggy Riccardi  
Vera Baranovskaya as La duchesse  
Louis Baron fils as Le roi  
René Donnio as William  
Jean Mercanton as Le groom  
Georges Bever 
Palau
Suzette O'Nil
Hubert Daix
Westenholz 
Armand Dranem 
Charlotte Martens
Martine de Breteuil
Inka Krymer

See also
Service for Ladies (1927)
Service for Ladies (1932)

References

External links

French comedy films
1932 comedy films
Films directed by Karl Anton
French multilingual films
Sound film remakes of silent films
Films set in hotels
Films set in restaurants
Films shot at Joinville Studios
French black-and-white films
1932 multilingual films
1930s French films